Gran Hermano 4 is the fourth season of the reality television series Gran Hermano which was broadcast in Spain on Telecinco and La Siete and produced by Endemol. Season 4 lasted for 103 days from October 6, 2002 to January 16, 2003. Pedro Oliva emerged as the winner.

Start Date: October 6, 2002
End Date: January 16, 2003

Duration: 103 days

The Finalists: 3 - Pedro (The Winner), Desirée (Runner-up) and Rafa (3rd)

Evicted Housemates: 9 - Anna, Gustavo († 30 June 2006), Inma, Judith, Mario, Matías, Nacho, Rocío and Sonia

Voluntary Exits: 1 - María

Pedro Oliva was in Supervivientes: Perdidos en Honduras on 2007.

Matías was in Supervivientes: Perdidos en Honduras on 2009.

Sonia was in Supervivientes: Perdidos en Nicaragua on 2010.

In the 2010 season "Gran Hermano: El Reencuentro" (All Stars), Nacho and Desirée returned to the house.

Contestants in eviction order

Nominations Table

Notes

2002 Spanish television seasons
2003 Spanish television seasons
GH 4